Zaranou is a town in eastern Ivory Coast. It is a sub-prefecture of Abengourou Department in Indénié-Djuablin Region, Comoé District.

Zaranou was a commune until March 2012, when it became one of 1126 communes nationwide that were abolished.
In 2014, the population of the sub-prefecture of Zaranou was 33,539.

Villages
The ten villages of the sub-prefecture of Zaranou and their population in 2014 are:

References

°

Sub-prefectures of Indénié-Djuablin
Former communes of Ivory Coast